Kolompoor is a 1999 Sri Lankan Sinhala comedy, family film directed by Dinesh Priyasad and produced by Lalindra Wijewickrama for Lalindra Films. It stars comic duo Bandu Samarasinghe, and Tennyson Cooray in lead roles along with Dilhani Ekanayake, Freddie Silva and Tony Ranasinghe. Music for the film is done by Somapala Rathnayake. The film became one of Sri Lanka's blockbuster movies with reaching more than 150 days in cinema theatres. It is the 919th Sri Lankan film in the Sinhala cinema.

Plot

Cast
 Bandu Samarasinghe as S.P Liyanagedara Bandu 
 Tennyson Cooray as Thadawansa and 6 others. (kadukkama, minister, businessman, tamilan, farmer, homosexual boy)
 Freddie Silva as Freddie
 Tony Ranasinghe as Alpabet Danthanarayana
 Harsha Jayawardena as Pooja
 Dilhani Ekanayake as Tanisha
 Wimal Kumara de Costa as Costapal
 Sunil Hettiarachchi as I.Opatha 
 Teddy Vidyalankara as Brando
 Robin Fernando as Detective
 Piyadasa Wijekoon as Lorry Munna
 Somapala Rathnayake as Poosari

Soundtrack

Distribution
The film successfully screened in 15 cinemas from its distribution date in Colombo. It was screened more than 150 days in three cinemas.

References

1999 films
1990s Sinhala-language films